Bright Light may refer to:

 Bright Light (CIA), a CIA clandestine interrogation center in Bucharest
 "The Bright Light", a song by Tanya Donelly on the 1997 album Lovesongs for Underdogs
 Bright Light Ballads, a 2009 album of Howard Eliott Payne
 Bright light therapy, a treatment for Seasonal Affective Disorder
 Bright Light Bright Light, Welsh singer
 Brightlight Pictures, Canadian film and television production company 
 Brightlight Productions, Philippine television production company
 EA Bright Light, a UK game developer founded by Electronic Arts

See also 
 
 Bright Lights (disambiguation)
 Lite-Brite, an electronic toy